This is a list of countries by salt production. The six leading salt producers in the world, Australia, Canada, China, Germany, India, and the United States, account for more than half of the worldwide production.

The first table includes data by the British Geological Survey (BGS) for countries with available statistics.
The second table includes data by the United States Geological Survey (USGS) for the leading producers.

Lists
Click on one of the small triangles in the headings to re-order the list according to that category.

References

External links
 World stats

Salt production
Salt production